Quamby Brook is a rural locality in the local government area of Meander Valley in the Launceston region of Tasmania. The 2016 census determined a population of 106 for the state suburb of Quamby Brook.

History
Quamby Brook was gazetted as a locality in 1968.

Geography
The watershed of the Cluan Tiers forms part of the north-eastern boundary.

Road infrastructure
The C502 route (Bogan Road) passes through from north to south. The C503 route (Quamby Brook Road) starts at an intersection with C502 and runs to the north-west corner, where it exits.

References

Localities of Meander Valley Council
Towns in Tasmania